Abdelmajid R'chich (also spelled Rechiche) (born March 28, 1942 in Kenitra) is a Moroccan filmmaker.

Biography 
R'chich studied directing at the IDHEC in Paris, where he graduated in 1963. Upon his return to Morocco a year later, he worked at the Moroccan Film Center (CCM) as a cameraman, before putting his film career on pause for a year to study anthropology and art history at the Université Libre de Bruxelles.

Filmography

Short films 
 1968: 6/12 
 1970: Forêt (Forest)
 1973: Al Boraq
 1975: La Marche verte (The Green March)
 1978: Scènes de chasse au Dadès
 1982:  Le Maroc Reve des Investisseurs
 1988:  Itineraires D'Enface
 1993: Mosquée Hassan II (Hassan II Mosque)
 1995: Salé, la splendeur d'une mémoire
 1996: Le Partage des eaux (The Sharing of Waters)
 1998: Kasbahs et Ksours (Kasbahs and Castles)

Feature films 
 2000: L'Histoire d'une rose (The Story of a Rose)
 2005: Ailes brisées (Shattered Wings)
 2011: Mémoire d'argile (Memory of Clay)

References 

Moroccan film directors
1942 births
Living people